Xavier Albertini (born 28 January 1970) is a French politician from Horizons who has been Member of Parliament for Marne's 1st constituency in the National Assembly since 2022.

Xavier Albertini, a business lawyer by profession, entered politics in 1995 as parliamentary assistant to Jean-Claude Étienne. Initially a member of the RPR, he became an elected official of the city of Reims in 2001 with Jean-Louis Schneiter.  

In 2014, he was second deputy to the mayor of Reims, Arnaud Robinet, in charge of security, events, good living, elections and worship. He retains this function for the re-election of the mayor in 2020 until his election in June 2022 to the mandate of deputy. The law on the non-accumulation of mandates prohibits a parliamentarian from being part of the executive of a local authority.

See also 

 List of deputies of the 16th National Assembly of France

References 

Living people
1970 births
People from Royan
Deputies of the 16th National Assembly of the French Fifth Republic
21st-century French politicians
Members of Parliament for Marne
Horizons politicians